Neuropeptidergic means "related to neuropeptides".

A neuropeptidergic agent (or drug) is a chemical which functions to directly modulate the neuropeptide systems in the body or brain. An example is opioidergics.

See also
 Adenosinergic
 Cannabinoidergic
 Cholinergic
 GABAergic
 Glutamatergic
 Glycinergic
 Histaminergic
 Monoaminergic
 Opioidergic

References

Neurochemistry
Neurotransmitters